United Nations Security Council Resolution 390, adopted on May 28, 1976, considered a report by the Secretary-General regarding the United Nations Disengagement Observer Force.  The Council noted the efforts made to establish a durable and just peace in the Middle East but expressed its concern over the prevailing state of tension in the area.  The Resolution decided:

(a) To call upon the parties concerned to implement immediately Security Council resolution 338 (1973) of 22 October 1973;
(b) To renew the mandate of the United Nations Disengagement Observer Force for another period of six months;
(c) To request the Secretary-General to submit at the end of this period a report on the developments in the situation and the measures taken to implement resolution 338 (1973).

The resolution passed with 13 votes; China and Libya did not participate in voting.

See also
Arab–Israeli conflict
Israeli occupation of the Golan Heights
Israel–Syria relations
List of United Nations Security Council Resolutions 301 to 400 (1971–1976)

References
Text of the Resolution at undocs.org

External links
 

 0390
Golan Heights
 0390
May 1976 events